The Shaw River, a perennial river of the Glenelg Hopkins catchment, is located in the Western District of Victoria, Australia.

Course and features
The Shaw River rises near  and flows generally south, across a coastal plain, joined by three minor tributaries before reaching its confluence with the Eumeralla River in Lake Yambuk. The Eumeralla empties into Portland Bay in the Great Australian Bight south of Yambuk. The river descends  over its  course.

The river is traversed by the Great Ocean Road near its confluence with the Eumeralla River in Lake Yambuk, at the Yambuk Important Bird Area.

Etymology
It was named by Major Mitchell in 1836 after General Sir James Shaw Kennedy, a Peninsular War veteran.

See also

References 

Glenelg Hopkins catchment
Rivers of Barwon South West (region)
Western District (Victoria)